Wágner is a name. As a given name, it is Portuguese in origin. The surname is a Czechized form of German surname Wagner. Notable people with the name include:

Given name
 Wágner (footballer, born 1945), full name Wágner Canotilho, Brazilian footballer
 Wágner (footballer, born 1973), full name Wágner Pires de Almeida, Brazilian footballer
 Wágner (footballer, born 1985), full name Wágner Ferreira dos Santos, Brazilian footballer
 Wágner (footballer, born 1987), full name Wágner de Andrade Borges, Brazilian footballer
 Wágner (footballer, born 1989), full name Wágner Luiz Fogolari, Brazilian footballer

Surname
 Martin Wágner (born 1980), Czech photographer
 Tomáš Wágner (born 1990), Czech footballer

See also
 
 Vagner
 Wagner (disambiguation)

Portuguese masculine given names
Czech-language surnames